Amphilectus is a genus of demosponges, comprising around 20 species found in oceans around the world.

Species
The following species are recognized in the genus Amphilectus:
 Amphilectus americanus (Ridley & Dendy, 1887)
 Amphilectus columnatus (Topsent, 1890)
 Amphilectus dactylus Goodwin, Jones, Neely & Brickle, 2011
 Amphilectus digitatus (Miklucho-Maclay, 1870)
 Amphilectus fimbriatus Goodwin, Jones, Neely & Brickle, 2016
 Amphilectus flabellatus Burton, 1932
 Amphilectus fleecei Goodwin, Jones, Neely & Brickle, 2011
 Amphilectus fucorum (Esper, 1794)
 Amphilectus glaber (Brøndsted, 1924)
 Amphilectus informis (Stephens, 1915)
 Amphilectus laxus (Lambe, 1893)
 Amphilectus lesliei (Uriz, 1988)
 Amphilectus munitus Whitelegge, 1907
 Amphilectus ovulum (Schmidt, 1870)
 Amphilectus pedicellatus (Lundbeck, 1905)
 Amphilectus rugosus (Thiele, 1905)
 Amphilectus strepsichelifer van Soest, Beglinger & De Voogd, 2012
 Amphilectus typichela (Lundbeck, 1905)
 Amphilectus unciger (Topsent, 1928)
 Amphilectus utriculus van Soest, Beglinger & De Voogd, 2012

References

Cladorhizidae